Faye Schulman (28 November 1919 – 24 April 2021) was a Jewish partisan photographer, and the only such photographer to photograph their struggle in Eastern Europe during World War II. Her full name was Faigel "Faye" Lazebnik Schulman.

Early life
Faigel Lazebnik was born on November 28, 1919, in Sosnkowicze, Eastern Poland (now Lenin in Western Belarus) as the fifth of seven children born to Yakov and Rayzel (Migdalovich) Lazebnik. The family were Orthodox Jews and at age 10, Faye was apprenticed to the village photographer and brother Moishe, later taking over his studio at age 16.

Surviving the Holocaust 
After the Nazis invaded Belarus, her family was imprisoned in the Lenin Ghetto. On August 14, 1942, German forces killed 1,850 Jews from the ghetto, including much of her family. 26 Jews were not killed, and Schulman was spared because of her photographic skills. She was recruited to work as a photographer for the Nazis. She developed a photograph which she saw depicted her family dead in a mass grave, and this convinced her to join the resistance. She joined the Molotava Brigade which was composed mostly of Soviet prisoners of war who had escaped from German captivity, and worked for them as a nurse from September 1942 to July 1944. After a raid of Lenin, she obtained her photography equipment, taking over 100 photographs of the Resistance. When the Red Army liberated Belarus in July 1944, she was reunited with two of her brothers and left the brigade after being introduced to her future husband, Morris Schulman.

About the Soviet partisans, Schulman recalled that "sex was not a major issue in our group. We didn't think in terms of men and women, boys and girls. We treated each other as equals. There were no special privileges for women; we were all partisans and we knew that death in war did not spare anyone. Certainly in battle, there was no differentiation between men and women. All our thoughts were concentrated on defeating the enemy." In her memoir, she told of thievery and drunkenness, of an officer who nearly killed her when she rejected his advances, and of antisemitism, writing: "Because I was Jewish, I had to work twice as hard to be deemed as worthy as the gentile girls. When I worked night and day I was told, 'You are not like a Jewish girl. You are just like the Russian girls.' This was meant to be a compliment." She always replied: "'Yes, but I am Jewish.' My work as a nurse, a photographer and most of all as a soldier was plentiful reason for me to stand tall, to be proud of myself and my heritage."

In spite of those shortcomings, she was grateful to the partisans for their help in defeating the Nazis. About the experience, she wrote: "We all belonged to one brigade. We learned to live together, eat together, fight together and survive together. We also needed to get along with each other. Sometimes it was hard to live through one day, let alone years. There was a strong friendship, cooperation and loyalty amongst most of us and a willingness to help each other. In the forest, connections were made between disparate people. Cold, hunger, stress forced strangers to become like family. We were also comrades in arms, all dealing with the same life-and-death circumstances. Our lives were bonded by the dangerous conditions under which we constantly lived. A special bond, nonetheless, existed among those of us who had experienced similar horrors under the Nazis."

Post-war
In 1944, Faye wed Morris Schulman and lived in Pinsk, Belarus. After the war, the couple stayed in the Landsberg displaced persons camp in Germany, where they helped to smuggle weapons to support Israeli independence. In 1948, they immigrated to Canada where she worked in a dress factory and later hand-tinted photographs and painted in oils.

Legacy and writings
Schulman has been decorated by the Soviet/Belorussian, American and Canadian governments. In 1995, she wrote A Partisan's Memoir: Woman of the Holocaust. She was later featured in a 1999 PBS documentary, “Daring to Resist: Three Women Face the Holocaust.”

Personal life
In 1948, Schulman immigrated to Toronto. She is survived by two children (Sidney and Susan), six grandchildren (Michael, Daniel, Nathan, Rachelle, Matthew, and Steven), and three great grandchildren (Imogene, Beckham, and Lila).

References

1919 births
2021 deaths
20th-century Polish women writers
20th-century women photographers
Canadian women memoirists
Canadian memoirists
Holocaust photographers
Jewish Canadian writers
Jewish partisans
Jewish women writers
Place of birth missing
Polish centenarians
Polish emigrants to Canada
20th-century Polish Jews
Polish memoirists
Polish women artists
Polish women photographers
Polish women in World War II resistance
Women centenarians
Women photojournalists